Xu Kaicheng (born 8 August 1990) is a Chinese actor. He is known for his roles in the web dramas I Cannot Hug You, Moonshine and Valentine, I'm a Pet At Dali Temple and Well-Intended Love.

Biography
Xu was born in Shanghai, China. He learned dance since young, and enrolled in the Shanghai Theater Academy in 2007, majoring in ballet. Xu first appeared in the variety program Jia You Hao Nan Er.

Career
In 2012, Xu signed a contract with Ming Dao's entertainment agency, and made his acting debut in the television series The Queen of SOP 2. He continued to star in various supporting roles in television series.

In 2017, Xu first gained recognition with his role as a vampire in the fantasy web drama I Cannot Hug You.

In 2018, Xu starred in the fantasy romance drama Moonshine and Valentine as the second male lead. The series was a commercial success and Xu became known to wider audiences. The same year, he played his first leading role in the historical comedy web series I'm a Pet at The Dali Temple, which was a moderate success.

In 2019, Xu starred in the romantic comedy web drama Well-Intended Love. The series was a hit and led to increased popularity and recognition for Xu. The same year, he starred in the fencing drama Boys To Men.

In 2020, Xu starred in the xianxia romance comedy Dance of the Phoenix. He was cast in the historical fantasy drama Novoland: Pearl Eclipse.

Filmography

Film

Television series

Discography

Awards and nominations

References

External links
 

1990 births
Living people
Male actors from Shanghai
Shanghai Theatre Academy alumni
21st-century Chinese male actors
Chinese male television actors
Chinese male film actors